The Indian barrier state or buffer state was a British proposal to establish a Native American state in the portion of the Great Lakes region of North America. It was never created. The idea was to create it west of the Appalachian Mountains, bounded by the Ohio and Mississippi rivers and the Great Lakes. The concept of establishing such a state, first conceived in the late 1750s, was part of a long-term plan to reconcile the Indian tribes to British presence and diminish hostilities between the tribes and the British Army following its victory in the French and Indian War in 1763. After the region was assigned to the United States in the 1783 Treaty of Paris ending the American Revolutionary War, British officials pursued efforts to organize the various tribes within it into a sort of Confederation that would form the basis of an Indian state, independent of the United States and under their tutelage. The goal was to protect the British fur trade ventures in the region and to block American expansion westward.

Among the plan's most ardent proponents were Mohawk leader Joseph Brant and Lieutenant Governor of Upper Canada John Graves Simcoe. In 1814 the British government abandoned efforts to bring such a state into being with the signing of the Treaty of Ghent with the United States.

Proclamation of 1763 
The British first proposed a barrier state in discussions with France in 1755. In 1763, Britain took control of all of the land east of the Mississippi River, and so negotiations with France became irrelevant. Instead, the British Crown issued the Proclamation of 1763, which was designed to keep the American settlers east of the Appalachian Mountains and physically separate from the main Indian settlements. The proclamation left the west under British control but alienated the eastern colonies, which claimed legal rights to most of the land involved. Furthermore, the British colonial governors had awarded large tracts of land in lieu of salary to soldiers who fought on behalf of the British, such as Colonel George Washington, who fought hard to make sure that he and the Virginia veterans received their promised rewards. There was great legal confusion for the next decade.

American Revolution 
Through the Quebec Act of 1774, the British made the western lands part of Quebec. That is, they were to be under the control of the British governors based in Quebec. This was one of the Intolerable Acts that eventually led to the American Revolution. The western lands were heatedly disputed during the Revolution with the Patriots first gaining control and the British making a recovery in 1780-82.

At the Paris treaty negotiations of 1782, the French floated a proposal that would give the British control north of the Ohio River, with the lands south of the Ohio River and east of the Mississippi River divided into two Indian states. The state to the southeast would be under American supervision; the state to the southwest would be under Spanish supervision. The Americans rejected the plan. The final Treaty of Paris gave the western lands to the United States, with British Canada to the north, Spanish Florida to the south, and Spanish Louisiana to the west. The British largely abandoned the Indian allies living in the new nation. They were not a party to the treaty and did not recognize it until they were defeated militarily by the United States. The British promised to support the Indians and sold them guns and supplies and (until 1796) maintained forts in American territory.

The long-term British goals were to maintain friendly relations with the Indians, support the valuable fur trade based in Montreal, and prevent low-grade warfare between the Indian tribes and the American settlers. The Confederation Congress of the United States organized the entire region north of the Ohio into the Northwest Territory in 1787, with a mechanism to create new states once an area had gained sufficient population. Two years earlier, Congress had passed the Land Ordinance of 1785, which provided a means for the rapid surveying and sale of public lands in the region, thus encouraging organized settlement.

1790s 

In the early 1790s, British officials in Canada made an aggressive effort to organize the various tribes into a sort of confederation that would form the basis of an Indian state. An important impetus was the success of the Indians in destroying one-quarter of the entire United States Army at St. Clair's defeat (also known as the Battle of the Wabash) in November 1791. The British were surprised and delighted at the success of the Indians whom they had been supporting and arming for years. By 1794, using their base at Detroit (theoretically in American territory), they distributed supplies and munitions to numerous Indian tribes throughout the region.

The British plans were developed in Canada, but in 1794 the government in London reversed course and decided it was necessary to gain American favor, since a major war had broken out with France. London put the barrier state idea on hold and opened friendly negotiations with the Americans that led to the Jay Treaty of 1794. One provision was that British acceded to American demands to remove their forts from American territory in Michigan and Wisconsin. The British, from their forts in Upper Canada, continued to supply munitions to the Indians living in the United States.

War of 1812 
The War of 1812 in the west was fought for control of the would-be barrier state. The British made major gains in 1812, as a 2,000-strong American force surrendered Detroit and the Indian allies took control of parts of Ohio, Indiana and Illinois, as well as all of Michigan and Wisconsin and points west. In 1813, the Americans pushed back, and the Indian forces left the southern districts in order to support Tecumseh and the British. The Americans won control of Lake Erie, defeated the British at the Battle of the Thames in Upper Canada, and killed Tecumseh. Most of his alliance broke up.

By 1814, the Americans controlled all of Ohio, all of Indiana, Illinois south of Peoria, and the Detroit region of Michigan. The British and their Indian allies controlled the rest of Michigan and all of Wisconsin. With the Americans in control of Lake Erie and southwestern Upper Canada, the British were largely cut off from their units in Michigan and Wisconsin. Reinforcing them and supplying guns and gunpowder was quite difficult. The American negotiators at Ghent in 1814 refused to entertain proposals for a buffer state; they insisted on abiding by the terms of the Paris Peace Treaty and the Jay Treaty, which assigned the United States full control over Michigan, Wisconsin, and points south. Henry Goulburn, a British negotiator who took part in the Treaty of Ghent negotiations, remarked after meeting with American negotiators that "I had, till I came here, had no idea of the fixed determination which prevails in the breast of every American to extirpate the Indians and appropriate their territory."

In 1814, the British leadership in London realized that peaceful trade with the United States, as desired by British merchants, far outweighed in value the fur trade that was the economic basis of the barrier state. The British had suffered several major defeats at the hands of American forces during the war; they therefore dropped their demands for a barrier state and for military control over the Great Lakes. The Treaty of Ghent provided for a restoration of prewar boundaries, which determine most of the eastern stretch of the modern Canada–United States border. The treaty also guaranteed rights to the Indians living in the United States. After the war, the United States negotiated (sometimes forcibly) a series of treaties with the Indians in which their land claims were purchased, and the Indians were either assigned to reservations near their original homes or moved to reservations further west.

See also 
 Aboriginal title statutes in the Thirteen Colonies
 Indian removal
 Indian Reserve (1763)
 Origins of the War of 1812
Overhill Cherokee
Overmountain Men
Tecumseh's Confederacy
Trans-Appalachia
Western Confederacy
 Western theater of the American Revolutionary War
Wilderness Road

Notes

Further reading 
 Allen, Robert S. His Majesty's Indian Allies: British Indian Policy in the Defence of Canada 1774-1815 (Dundurn, 1996).

 Bemis, Samuel Flagg. Jay's Treaty: A Study in Commerce and Diplomacy (Macmillan, 1923) ch 5 online
 Calloway, Colin G. "Suspicion and Self‐Interest: The British‐Indian Alliance and the Peace of Paris." The Historian 48.1 (1985): 41-60.

 Farrand, Max. "The Indian Boundary Line," American Historical Review (1905) 10#4 pp. 782–791 free in JSTOR
 Hatheway, G. G. "The Neutral Indian Barrier State: A Project in British North American Policy, 1715-1815" (PhD dissertation, University of Minnesota, 1957) 
 Ibbotson, Joseph D. "Samuel Kirkland, the Treaty of 1792, and the Indian Barrier State." New York History 19#.4 (1938): 374-391. online

 Leavitt, Orpha E. "British Policy on the Canadian Frontier, 1782-92: Mediation and an Indian Barrier State" Proceedings of the State Historical Society of Wisconsin (1916) Volume 63 pp 151–85 online
 Smith, Dwight L. "A North American Neutral Indian Zone: Persistence of a British Idea." Northwest Ohio Quarterly 61#2-4 (1989): 46-63. traces idea from 1750s to 1814

External links 
 Map (in gray) of the proposed Indian barrier state.

 
History of the Midwestern United States
Pre-statehood history of Illinois
Pre-statehood history of Indiana
Pre-statehood history of Michigan
Pre-statehood history of Minnesota
Pre-statehood history of Ohio
Pre-statehood history of Wisconsin
Midwestern United States
History of United States expansionism
Canada–United States relations
British North America
Colonial United States (British)
Native American history
Aboriginal title in the United States
Proposed countries